Terrmel Sledge (born March 18, 1977) is an American former professional baseball outfielder and the former assistant hitting coach of the Chicago Cubs. He played in Major League Baseball (MLB) for the Montreal Expos/Washington Nationals and San Diego Padres and in Nippon Professional Baseball (NPB) for the Hokkaido Nippon-Ham Fighters and the Yokohama BayStars. Prior to being hired by the Cubs, he was the hitting coach for the Tulsa Drillers in the Texas League.

Playing career
Sledge's major league career began in 2004 with the Montreal Expos. He batted .269/.336/.462 with 15 home runs and 62 runs batted in in his rookie year. On September 29, 2004 he was the final out at the last Expos home game when he popped out to third base in 9-1 loss to the Florida Marlins
On October 3, 2004, he recorded the final RBI in Expos history when he drove in Jamey Carroll in a game against the New York Mets.

Sledge moved with the team to Washington, D.C. the following season as the Expos relocated, and hit the first-ever home run for the Washington Nationals. He was traded to the Texas Rangers along with fellow outfielder Brad Wilkerson and Armando Galarraga for second baseman Alfonso Soriano on December 7, 2005. He was subsequently traded to the San Diego Padres in a six-player deal on January 6, 2006.

On November 29, 2007, Sledge was granted permission by the Padres to sign with the Hokkaido Nippon-Ham Fighters of the Nippon Professional League.

On December 17, 2009, Sledge signed a contract with Yokohama BayStars for the 2010 season.

In October 2003, while training with the USA Olympic baseball team, Sledge became one of the first MLB players to test positive for performance-enhancing drugs.  Sledge was not subject to discipline by MLB as the substance was not barred under league rules at the time.

Coaching career
Sledge retired after the 2012 season and spent 2015 as the assistant hitting coach for the Eugene Emeralds. In 2016, he was named hitting coach for the Tulsa Drillers of the AA Texas League.

In late 2018, the Chicago Cubs hired Sledge as assistant hitting coach for the 2019 season. He took over the position held by Andy Haines, who was hired to be the Milwaukee Brewers' hitting coach. The organization did not tender Sledge a contract to return for the 2021 season.

Personal life
Sledge attended John F. Kennedy High School in Granada Hills, California and played college ball at Long Beach State. In 1997, he played collegiate summer baseball with the Brewster Whitecaps of the Cape Cod Baseball League.

Sledge is half Korean and half African American; his mother is Korean and his father is black. According to his father, his name is a combination of Terrence and Melvin, two names his parents had considered naming him when he was born.

References

External links

1977 births
Living people
African-American baseball players
American baseball players of Korean descent
American expatriate baseball players in Canada
American expatriate baseball players in Japan
Baseball players from North Carolina
Brewster Whitecaps players
Chicago Cubs coaches
Edmonton Trappers players
Everett AquaSox players
Harrisburg Senators players
Hokkaido Nippon-Ham Fighters players
Lancaster JetHawks players
Long Beach State Dirtbags baseball players
Major League Baseball first basemen
Major League Baseball hitting coaches
Major League Baseball left fielders
Major League Baseball right fielders
Minor league baseball coaches
Montreal Expos players
Nippon Professional Baseball infielders
Nippon Professional Baseball outfielders
Ottawa Lynx players
Portland Beavers players
San Diego Padres players
Sportspeople from Fayetteville, North Carolina
Washington Nationals players
Wisconsin Timber Rattlers players
Yokohama BayStars players
21st-century African-American sportspeople
20th-century African-American sportspeople